Corsicana Lemonade is the sixth full-length studio album by Austin, Texas-based band White Denim.  The album was released on October 29, 2013, by Downtown Records.

History
"Pretty Green" was the first song released as a single from the album. It was released on September 21, 2013, alongside the announcement of the album. Though the single has not charted on any chart to date, Billboard has reported that the single is close to charting on the Billboard Alternative Songs chart and also the Triple A airplay charts as well.

Commercial performance
The album debuted at number four on the Billboard Heatseekers Albums chart. The album sold more than 3,000 copies in its first week. The album also charted at #147 on Billboard 200 and remains the only album released by the band to chart.

Critical reception
{{Album ratings

| MC = 80/100 

| rev1 = AllMusic
| rev1Score = 
| rev2 = Consequence of Sound
| rev2Score =  
| rev3 = The Independent
| rev3Score =  
| rev4 = London Evening Standard
| rev4Score = 
| rev5 = NME
| rev5Score = 8/10
| rev6 = Rolling Stone
| rev6Score = <ref name=RollingStone>

The album was well received by music critics upon its initial release. At Metacritic, which assigns a normalized rating out of 100 to reviews from mainstream publications, the album received an average score of 80, based on 20 reviews, indicating "generally positive reviews."

Track listing

Charts

References

2013 albums
White Denim albums
Downtown Records albums
Jeff Tweedy